Joel David L'Esperance (born August 18, 1995) is an American professional ice hockey forward for the Grand Rapids Griffins of the American Hockey League (AHL).

Playing career

Amateur
L'Esperance as a Brighton, Michigan native, first played as a junior with the Detroit Compuware program through to the under-16 level. He was originally selected 41st overall in the 2011 United States Hockey League Futures Draft, however signed with the Tri-City Storm for the 2011–12 season.

He tallied 67 points in 111 career games in the USHL for the Storm and Sioux City Musketeers from 2011 to 2014 before committing to play collegiate hockey with Michigan Tech of the Western Collegiate Hockey Association (WCHA).

L'Esperance played four full seasons with the Huskies, potting 46 goals and 98 points through 158 games, helping the Michigan Tech claim the WCHA Championship in back-to-back seasons during his junior and senior years. Adding 27 points in 44 games as a Senior in the 2017–18 season, L'Esperance immediately embarked on his professional career by agreeing to an amateur try-out with the Texas Stars of the American Hockey League on March 27, 2018.

Professional
Joining Texas in their push to the post-season, L'Esperance made his debut the following day in a 3–2 shootout loss to the Grand Rapids Griffins on March 28, 2018. He later added his first professional goal in a 4–3 victory over the Rockford IceHogs on April 7, 2018. Registering 2 points in 9 regular season games, L'Esperance established a role in the playoffs appearing in all 22 postseason contests with Texas, recording four points in his first trip to the Calder Cup finals, before losing to the Toronto Marlies in seven games.

Undrafted, L'Esperance impressed with his growth in development through his senior year with the Huskies and try-out with Texas and was rewarded as a free agent with a two-year, entry-level contract with the Dallas Stars on July 2, 2018. After attending the Stars 2018 training camp, he was reassigned to begin the 2018–19 season with the Texas Stars. L'Esperance made an immediate impact with Texas, finding his scoring touch to impressively lead the league as a rookie in goals with 27 in 49 games earning a selection to the AHL All-Star Classic before receiving his first recall to the NHL on February 14, 2019. He made his NHL debut with the Stars, playing 15 minutes, in a 3–0 defeat to the Carolina Hurricanes at the PNC Arena in Raleigh, North Carolina on February 15, 2019. During the 2021–22 season he recorded a career-high 49 points on 24 goals and 25 assists in 62 games for the Texas Stars. In four seasons in the AHL with the Stars, he recorded 80 goals, 56 assists and 92 penalty minutes in 183 games. 

On July 13, 2022, as a free agent from the Stars, L'Esperance was signed to a two-year AHL contract with the Grand Rapids Griffins.

Career statistics

Awards and honours

References

External links

1995 births
Living people
American men's ice hockey centers
Dallas Stars players
Grand Rapids Griffins players
Ice hockey players from Michigan
Michigan Tech Huskies men's ice hockey players
People from Brighton, Michigan
Sioux City Musketeers players
Sportspeople from Metro Detroit
Texas Stars players
Tri-City Storm players
Undrafted National Hockey League players